Snowboarding at the 2020 Winter Youth Olympics took place in Leysin and Villars, Switzerland.

Events

Medal table

Boys' events

Girls' events

Mixed event
Will include athletes from freestyle skiing

Qualification

Summary

References

External links
Results Book – Snowboard

 
Youth Olympics
2020 Winter Youth Olympics events
2020